This is an episode listing of the Japanese animated TV series  and its sequel, Emma - A Victorian Romance: Second Act. 


Emma - A Victorian Romance 
The first season of Emma was produced by Studio Pierrot and Tokyo Broadcasting System, Inc. (TBS).

Emma - A Victorian Romance: Second Act 
The second season of Emma was produced by Ajia-do Animation Works. It details events that take place shortly after the first series concludes. Note that the following English episode names are not official translations.

See also
Emma - A Victorian Romance

References

Lists of anime episodes